Izabal may be:

 Izabal Department, one of the 22 departments of Guatemala
 Lake Izabal
 Izabal (town)
 Roman Catholic Vicariate Apostolic of Izabal
 Izabal JC, football club

See also
 Isabel
 Isabelle